Michael Noonan may refer to:

Writers and academics
Michael Noonan (Australian writer) (1921–2000), Australian novelist and radio script writer
Michael Noonan (linguist) (1947–2009), American linguist
Michael Noonan (filmmaker) (born 1972), Australian filmmaker and academic
Michael A. Noonan, New Zealand screenwriter

Politics
Michael K. Noonan, Irish Cumann na nGaedhael Party TD for Cork East, 1924–1927
Michael J. Noonan (Fianna Fáil politician) (1935–2013), Irish Fianna Fáil politician
Michael Noonan (Fine Gael politician) (born 1943), Irish Fine Gael politician and former party leader

Other
Mike Noonan (born 1961), American soccer coach
Michael Noonan (admiral) (born 1966), Australian admiral
Michael Noonan, a character from the novel Bag of Bones, by Stephen King